Larutia larutensis, also known as the black larut skink or Larut Hills larut skink, is a species of skink. It is endemic to Peninsular Malaysia.

References

larutensis
Reptiles of Malaysia
Endemic fauna of Malaysia
Reptiles described in 1900
Taxa named by George Albert Boulenger